Kea, also known as Tzia and in antiquity Keos, is a Greek island in the Cyclades archipelago in the Aegean Sea. Kea is part of the Kea-Kythnos regional unit.

Geography
It is the island of the Cyclades complex that is closest to Attica (about 1 hour by ferry from Lavrio) and is also  from Cape Sounio as well as  SE of Athens. Its climate is arid, and its terrain is hilly.
 
Its capital, Ioulis, is inland at a high altitude (like most ancient Cycladic settlements, for fear of pirates) and is considered quite picturesque. Other major villages of Kea are the port of Korissia and the fishing village of Vourkari. After suffering depopulation for many decades, Kea has been recently rediscovered by Athenians as a convenient destination for weekend and yachting trips. The population in 2019 was 2,568.

Local communities 
Chavouna
Ellinika 
Kato Meria
Ioulis
Korissia
Koundouros
Otzias
Pisses
Vourkari
Pera Meria

History 

Kea is the location of a Bronze Age settlement at the site now called Ayia Irini, which reached its height in the Late Minoan and Early Mycenaean eras (1600–1400 BC).

In the Archaic period, the island was divided between four city-states (poleis): Ioulis, Karthaia, Poieessa and Koressos.

During the classical period, Kea (Ceos) was the home of Simonides and of his nephew Bacchylides, both ancient Greek lyric poets, of the Sophist Prodicus, and of the physician Erasistratus. The inhabitants were known for offering sacrifices to the Dog Star, Sirius and to Zeus to bring cooling breezes while awaiting the reappearance of Sirius in summer; if the star rose clear, it would portend good fortune; if it was misty or faint, then it foretold (or emanated) pestilence. Coins retrieved from the island from the 3rd century BC feature dogs or stars with emanating rays, highlighting Sirius' importance.

The island is known for an ancient stone-carved lion, known as the Lion of Ioulis (or Liontas), which was carved some time prior to 600 BC. According to legend, the island of Kea was once home to population of water nymphs whose beauty, along with their lovely island, made the gods jealous, who sent a lion to lay waste to the island. In any case, the mainland of Greece was home to a significant population of lions throughout the classical period.

During the Byzantine period, many churches were built and the prosperity of the island rose. It was Byzantine until, in 1204, it was captured by the Venetians in the wake of the Fourth Crusade. The Archbishop of Athens, Michael Choniates, came here in exile after his city fell to the Crusaders in 1205. It was recaptured by the Byzantines under Licario in 1278. In around 1302 during the Byzantine–Venetian War, it again fell to the Venetians, who built a castle on the ancient acropolis of Ioulis.

Kea was taken from the Venetians by the Ottoman Turks in 1537. Along with the rest of the Cyclades, Kea joined Greece following the Greek War of Independence in 1821.

The HMHS Britannic, which is the third sister ship of the RMS Olympic and the ill-fated RMS Titanic, sank off Kea Island in November 21, 1916 on the Kea Channel after hitting a mine, with the loss of thirty lives. She is the largest ship sunk in World War I.

Ecclesiastical History

Orthodox Eparchy 
The earliest indication of it as a Greek bishopric is in a list by the Sicilian monk Neilos Doxapatres of the second half of the 12th century and this may have been a later interpolation, since the list of the Greek bishops of Kea begins only at the end of the 16th century.

Latin Catholic residential diocese 
In 1330, as part of the Venetian Duchy of Naxos, it became, under the name Ceo, the see of a Latin Church bishopric of Ceo in the Cyclades, which in 1600 was renamed bishopric of Diocese of Thermia (island Knythos), but suppressed in 1650, after the Ottoman conquest. It is today listed by the Catholic Church as a titular see.

Historical population 

The French traveler Jean de Thévenot reported 700 houses in the main town of Kea, now Ioulida, in 1656 (his compatriot the botanist Joseph Pitton de Tournefort guessed 2500 in 1700). The Greek historian Ioannis Psyllas estimated a population of more than 7000 on the island in 1821, a number that dropped sharply due to a plague outbreak that killed 1600 to 2000 Keans in 1823.

Official Greek census data shows a population of around 4000 in the 19th century, decreasing gradually until 1981 and then beginning to rebound under the influence of tourism.

Climate
Kea has a warm-summer Mediterranean climate.

Scuba diving 
The island is a destination for exploring nature and scuba diving, with excellent visibility, rich marine life, and wall, cavern and wreck diving. The water temperature ranges from 20° to 26 °C.

The highlight for recreational divers is the wreck of the paddle-wheeler steamship Patris which sank in 1868 and lies at a depth of 28 metres. She was a passenger steamer 66 m long, in service in the Aegean Sea, owned by the Hellenic Steamship Co., based on Syros island, at that time the capital of Greece. She hit the reef off Koundouros Bay at Makriopounda, Kea island on 24 February 1868 with about 120 passengers aboard. No casualties were reported owing to the proximity of land.

The French ship SS Burdigala is a recently discovered wreck,  from the island's harbour, at 53 m depth. Sunk 14 November 1916, she was a 180 m long ocean liner built in Germany by Ferdinand Schichau Werft.

Notable people 
Simonides ( 556 BC – 468 BC) lyric poet
Bacchylides (5th century BC) lyric poet
Prodicus (5th century BC) sophist
Theramenes (late 5th century BC) Athenian statesman
Aristo (3rd century BC) peripatetic philosopher
Emmanouil Papadopoulos (died 1810), Russian general
Patriarch Meletius III of Constantinople
Cyparissos Stephanos (1857–1917), mathematician
 John Angelo Congear, father of great Australian AFL footballer, Angelo Congear

In literature

Kea is the scene of much of Mary Renault's novel, The Praise Singer.

See also 
 Communities of the Cyclades

References

External links 

 Official Island website
 GigaCatholic, with incumbent biography links
 An 1885 travel guide to Keos (Zea), an excerpt from James Theodore Bent's The Cyclades, or Life among the Insular Greeks

 
Minoan geography
Municipalities of the South Aegean
Populated places in Kea-Kythnos
Landforms of Kea-Kythnos
Islands of the South Aegean
Members of the Delian League